In Virgil's Aeneid, Iopas is a bard at the court of Dido. He appears at the end of Book 1, where he sings the so-called "Song of Iopas", a creation narrative, at the banquet given for Aeneas and his Trojans.

Text, context
The passage in Virgil:

...cithara crinitus Iopas
personat aurata, docuit quem maximus Atlas.
hic canit errantem lunam solisque labores,
unde hominum genus et pecudes, unde imber et ignes,
Arcturum pluuiasque Hyadas geminosque Triones,
quid tantum Oceano properent se tingere soles
hiberni, uel quae tardis mora noctibus obstet

A student of Atlas, the maestro,
Livens the air with his gilded harp. For the long-haired Iopas
Sings of the unpredictable moon, of the sun and its labours,
Origins human and animal, causes of fire and of moisture,
Stars (Lesser, Greater Bear, rainy Hyades, also Arcturus),
Why in the winter the sun so hurries to dive in the Ocean,
What slows winter's lingering nights, what blocks and delays them. (Tr. Frederick Ahl)

As Christine G. Perkell points out, Iopas's song consists of "commonplaces of the didactic genre" rather than heroic song, which is the kind of song one could have expected from a court poet like Phemius or Demodocus from the Odyssey. Iopas's song resembles Lucretius's De Rerum Natura, Hesiod's Works and Days, and Virgil's own Georgics.

Interpretation
Many interpretations have been offered for Iopas's song. Classicist Eve Adler, who paid particular attention to how the Trojans at the banquet wait until the Carthaginians have expressed their appreciation before applauding the song, notes that Iopas's naturalistic explanation of the world (requiring no gods) comes as a surprise to the Trojans; Adler sees the passage as anticipated in Virgil's Georgics, at the end of Book 2 and the beginning of Book 3. For Adler, Iopas is a kind of Lucretius-figure (whose message Virgil rejects). Classicist Timothy Power considers that Iopas evokes King Juba II of Numidia, famous augustal scholar.

References 

Characters in the Aeneid